Data Processing Iran Company (DPI) (Dadheperdazi-ye Iran) is a computer, technology and IT Consulting corporation headquartered in Tehran, Iran. DPI is currently the largest technology provider in Iran

DPI manufactures and sells computer hardware and software (with a focus on the latter), and offers infrastructure services, hosting services, and consulting services in areas ranging from mainframe computers to nanotechnology.

The company also offers a series of  Internet-related services, namely dedicated servers; colocation services; Web hosting services, such as shared hosting, shared mail, DNS recording, and domain registration services; and managed services, including network services, security services, managed application services, storage and backup services, monitoring and reporting, and professional services.

History

DPI was established in 1959 as a regional branch for the IBM corporation. The company operated as a subsidiary until 1981, when IBM's operations in Iran were ceded to the Iranian government. In 2001, DPI became a private company, listed under the Tehran Stock Exchange. Over the company's history, DPI has signed numerous technology-sharing agreements with other software companies, including Mindscape, Dataproducts and Hypercom.

See also
Communications in Iran

References

Former IBM subsidiaries
Computer companies of Iran
Companies listed on the Tehran Stock Exchange
Cloud computing providers
Computer storage companies
Display technology companies
Iranian brands
Computer companies established in 1957
Companies based in Tehran
Iranian companies established in 1957